Johannes Bogerman (1576 – 11 September 1637) was a Frisian Protestant divine.

He was born in Uplewert (Now Ostfriesland, Germany), the son of a preacher. From 1591 onwards, he studied in Franeker, Heidelberg, Geneva, Zürich, Lausanne, Oxford and Cambridge. In 1599, he became pastor in Sneek, 1603 in Enkhuizen and 1604 in Leeuwarden. In 1636, he became professor for theology in Franeker.

He helped translate the Bible into Dutch (the Statenbijbel) and was appointed as President of the Synod of Dort which authorized the translation and produced the Canons of Dort, otherwise known as the Five Points of Calvinism. His advisor was William Ames and, despite himself being Supralapsarian, argued at the Synod for the Canons to include the Infralapsarian position. According to Simon Kistemaker, he was a "peace-loving president, who through patience and kindness was able to control the emotional and even quarrelsome natures of the delegates."

As a Calvinist, he preached against Anabaptists, Mennonites, Jesuits and the Arminians. He died in Franeker.

References

Literature 
 BWGN I, 466 ff.
 NNBW I, 390 ff.
 Christelijke Encyclopedie I, Kampen 1956, 687 f.
 RGG I, 1345.
 H. Edema van der Tuuk: J. Bogermann, Gröningen 1868.
 Vriemoet: Series Prof. Franeker. p. 265.

External links
 Schaff-Herzog article

 Levensbeschrijving van Johannes Bogerman  
 Wie was Johannes Bogerman? 

1576 births
1637 deaths
Dutch Calvinist and Reformed theologians
17th-century Calvinist and Reformed theologians
Translators of the Bible into Dutch
Participants in the Synod of Dort
Academic staff of the University of Franeker
East Frisians
Supralapsarians
People from Krummhörn
People from Sneek